is a Japanese politician, an independent and member of the House of Councillors in the Diet (national legislature). A native of Yomitan, Okinawa and high school graduate, she served in the assembly of Okinawa Prefecture for three terms, starting in 1992, and was elected to the House of Councillors for the first time in 2004. After running unsuccessfully for governorship of Okinawa Prefecture in 2006, she was re-elected to the House of Councillors in 2007.

Itokazu is a member of the Church of Jesus Christ of Latter-day Saints.

References

External links 
  in Japanese.

Members of the House of Councillors (Japan)
Female members of the House of Councillors (Japan)
Japanese Latter Day Saints
Living people
1947 births
Politicians from Okinawa Prefecture